Indian English literature (IEL), also referred to as Indian Writing in English (IWE), is the body of work by writers in India who write in the English language but whose native or co-native language could be one of the numerous languages of India. Its early history began with the works of Henry Louis Vivian Derozio and Michael Madhusudan Dutt followed by Rabindranath Tagore and Sri Aurobindo. R. K. Narayan, Mulk Raj Anand and Raja Rao contributed to the growth and popularity of Indian English fiction in the 1930s. It is also associated, in some cases, with the works of members of the Indian diaspora who subsequently compose works in English. 

It is frequently referred to as Indo-Anglian literature. (Indo-Anglian is a specific term in the sole context of writing that should not be confused with Anglo-Indian). Although some Indo-Anglian works may be classified under the genre of postcolonial literature, the repertoire of Indian English literature encompasses a wide variety of themes and ideologies, from the late eighteenth-century to the present day, and thereby eludes easy categorization.

History
IEL has a relatively recent history, being nearly two centuries old. The first book written by an Indian in English was The Travels of Dean Mahomet, a travel narrative by Sake Dean Mahomed, published in England in 1794. IEL, in its early stages had influence from The Western novel . Early Indian writers used English unadulterated by Indian words to convey an experience which was essentially Indian. Bankim Chandra Chattopadhyay (1838–1894) wrote Rajmohan's Wife and published it in 1864, making it the first Indian novel written in English. Lal Behari Dey's Govinda Samanta or the History of a Bengali Raiyat was published in 1874 and the same author's Folk Tales of Bengal: Life's Secret was published in 1912. Bianca, or The Young Spanish Maiden (1878) by Toru Dutt was the first novel written by an Indian woman. Both Toru Dutt and Krupabai Satthianandhan, two promising Indian English writers of the nineteenth century died untimely in their early twenties and thirties respectively. Satthianadhan's autobiographical novel Saguna: A Story of Native Christian Life was published serially in The Madras Christian College Magazine from 1887 to 1888. The only other novel by Satthianandhan is Kamala: The Story of a Hindu Life (1894). 

The non-fictional body of prose-works, consisting of letters, diaries, political manifesto, articles, speeches, philosophical works etc. in Indian English literature of the nineteenth and the early twentieth century, is rich and varied. The speeches of Swami Vivekananda, Rabindranath Tagore, Chittaranjan Das, Bal Gangadhar Tilak, Mahatma Gandhi and Subhas Chandra Bose, to name only a few,  shaped the destiny of modern India and also the destiny of English language in India (Auddy, 9-10). Gandhi's Indian Home Rule or Hind Swaraj (1910) was written in an indigenised variety of the English language and challenged successfully 'the hegemony of Standard English' (Auddy, 169) even before R. K. Narayan, M. R. Anand and Raja Rao.

Raja Rao (1908–2006), Indian philosopher and writer, authored Kanthapura and The Serpent and the Rope, which are Indian in terms of their storytelling qualities. Kisari Mohan Ganguli translated the Mahabharata into English, the only time the epic has ever been translated in its entirety into a European language. Rabindranath Tagore (1861–1941) wrote in Bengali and English and was responsible for the translations of his own work into English. Dhan Gopal Mukerji (1890–1936) was the first Indian author to win a literary award in the United States. Nirad C. Chaudhuri (1897–1999), a writer of non-fiction, is best known for his The Autobiography of an Unknown Indian (1951), in which he relates his life experiences and influences. P. Lal (1929–2010), a poet, translator, publisher and essayist, founded a press in the 1950s for Indian English writing, Writers Workshop. Ram Nath Kak (1917–1993), a Kashmiri veterinarian, wrote his autobiography Autumn Leaves, which is one of the most vivid portraits of life in 20th century Kashmir and has become a sort of a classic.

R. K. Narayan (1906–2001) contributed over many decades and continued to write till his death. He was discovered by Graham Greene in the sense that the latter helped him find a publisher in England. Greene and Narayan remained close friends till the end. Similar to the way Thomas Hardy used Wessex, Narayan created the fictitious town of Malgudi where he set his novels. Some criticise Narayan for the parochial, detached and closed world that he created in the face of the changing conditions in India at the times in which the stories are set. Others, such as Greene, however, feel that through Malgudi they could vividly understand the Indian experience. Narayan's evocation of small-town life and its experiences through the eyes of the endearing child protagonist Swaminathan in Swami and Friends is a good sample of his writing style. Simultaneous with Narayan's pastoral idylls, a very different writer, Mulk Raj Anand (1905–2004), was similarly gaining recognition for his writing set in rural India, but his stories were harsher, and engaged, sometimes brutally, with divisions of caste, class and religion. According to writer Lakshmi Holmström, "The writers of the 1930s were fortunate because after many years of use, English had become an Indian language used widely and at different levels of society, and therefore they could experiment more boldly and from a more secure position." Kamala Markandeya is an early writer in IEL who has often grouped with the trinity of R.K. Narayan, Mulk Raj Anand and Raja Rao. The contributions of Manoj Das and Manohar Malgoankar to growth of IEL largely remains unacknowledged.

Later history

Among the later writers, the most notable is Salman Rushdie, born in India and now living in the UK. Rushdie, with his famous work Midnight's Children (Booker Prize 1981, Booker of Bookers 1992, and Best of the Bookers 2008), ushered in a new trend of writing. He used a hybrid language – English generously peppered with Indian terms – to convey a theme that could be seen as representing the vast canvas of India. He is usually categorised under the magic realism mode of writing most famously associated with Gabriel García Márquez. Nayantara Sehgal was one of the first female Indian writers in English to receive wide recognition. Her fiction deals with India's elite responding to the crisis engendered by political change. She was awarded the 1986 Sahitya Akademi Award for English, for her novel, Rich Like Us (1985), by the Sahitya Akademi, India's National Academy of Letters. Anita Desai, who was shortlisted for the Booker Prize three times, received a Sahitya Akademi Award in 1978 for her novel Fire on the Mountain and a British Guardian Prize for The Village by the Sea. Her daughter Kiran Desai won the 2006 Man Booker Prize for her second novel, The Inheritance of Loss. Ruskin Bond received Sahitya Akademi Award for his collection of short stories Our Trees Still Grow in Dehra in 1992. He is also the author of a historical novel A Flight of Pigeons, which is based on an episode during the Indian Rebellion of 1857. 

Vikram Seth, author of The Golden Gate (1986) and A Suitable Boy (1994) is a writer who uses a purer English and more realistic themes. Being a self-confessed fan of Jane Austen, his attention is on the story, its details and its twists and turns. Vikram Seth is notable both as an accomplished novelist and a prolific poet.

Another writer who has contributed immensely to the Indian English Literature is Amitav Ghosh who is the author of The Circle of Reason (his 1986 debut novel), The Shadow Lines (1988), The Calcutta Chromosome (1995), The Glass Palace (2000), The Hungry Tide (2004), and Sea of Poppies (2008), the first volume of The Ibis trilogy, set in the 1830s, just before the Opium War, which encapsulates the colonial history of the East. Ghosh's latest work of fiction is River of Smoke (2011), the second volume of The Ibis trilogy.

Rohinton Mistry is an India born Canadian author who is a Neustadt International Prize for Literature laureate (2012). His first book Tales from Firozsha Baag (1987) published by Penguin Books Canada is a collection of 11 short stories. His novels Such a Long Journey (1991) and A Fine Balance (1995) earned him great acclaim. In a similar vein, M. G. Vassanji was born in Kenya of Indian descent and emigrated to Canada; he twice won the Giller Prize, for The Book of Secrets (1994) and The In-Between World of Vikram Lall (2003), as well as the Governor General's Award for English-language non-fiction for A Place Within: Rediscovering India (2008), a travelogue.

Shashi Tharoor, in his The Great Indian Novel (1989), follows a story-telling (though in a satirical) mode as in the Mahabharata drawing his ideas by going back and forth in time. His work as UN official living outside India has given him a vantage point that helps construct an objective Indianness. Vikram Chandra is another author who shuffles between India and the United States and has received critical acclaim for his first novel Red Earth and Pouring Rain (1995) and collection of short stories Love and Longing in Bombay (1997). His namesake Vikram A. Chandra is a renowned journalist and the author of The Srinagar Conspiracy (2000). Suketu Mehta is another writer currently based in the United States who authored Maximum City (2004), an autobiographical account of his experiences in the city of Mumbai. In 2008, Aravind Adiga received the Man Booker Prize for his debut novel The White Tiger.

Recent writers in India such as Arundhati Roy and David Davidar show a direction towards contextuality and rootedness in their works. Arundhati Roy, a trained architect and the 1997 Booker prize winner for her The God of Small Things, calls herself a "home grown" writer. Her award-winning book is set in the immensely physical landscape of Kerala. Davidar sets his The House of Blue Mangoes in Southern Tamil Nadu. In both the books, geography and politics are integral to the narrative. In his novel Lament of Mohini (2000), Shreekumar Varma touches upon the unique matriarchal system and the sammandham system of marriage as he writes about the Namboodiris and the aristocrats of Kerala. Similarly, Arnab Jan Deka, a trained engineer and jurist, writes about both physical and ethereal existentialism on the banks of the mighty river Brahmaputra. His co-authored book of poetry with British poet-novelist Tess Joyce, appropriately titled A Stanza of Sunlight on the Banks of Brahmaputra (1983), published from both India and Britain (2009), evokes the spirit of flowing nature of life. His most recent book Brahmaputra and Beyond : Linking Assam to the World(2015) made a conscious effort to connect to a world divided by racial, geographic, linguistic, cultural and political prejudices. His highly acclaimed short story collection The Mexican Sweetheart & other stories(2002) was another landmark book of this genre. Jahnavi Barua, a Bangalore-based author from Assam has set her critically acclaimed collection of short stories Next Door on the social scenario in Assam with insurgency as the background.

Most recently,  Rajeeva Nayan Pathak (b 1972) in his romantic novel  The Living Splits' sensitizes about the people in need of organ transplantation for their survival, thus promotes organ donation and cadaver transplantation.

The stories and novels of Ratan Lal Basu reflect the conditions of tribal people and hill people of West Bengal and the adjacent states of Sikkim, Bhutan and Nepal. Many of his short stories reflect the political turmoil of West Bengal since the Naxalite movement of the 1970s. Many of his stories like Blue Are the Far Off Mountains, The First Rain and The Magic Marble glorify purity of love. His novel Oraon and the Divine Tree is the story of a tribal and his love for an age old tree. In Hemingway style language the author takes the reader into the dreamland of nature and people who are inexorably associated with nature.

Debates
One of the key issues raised in this context is the superiority/inferiority of IWE (Indian Writing in English) as opposed to the literary production in the various languages of India. Key polar concepts bandied in this context are superficial/authentic, imitative/creative, shallow/deep, critical/uncritical, elitist/parochial and so on.

The views of Salman Rushdie and Amit Chaudhuri expressed through their books The Vintage Book of Indian Writing and The Picador Book of Modern Indian Literature respectively essentialise this battle.

Rushdie's statement in his book – "the ironic proposition that India's best writing since independence may have been done in the language of the departed imperialists is simply too much for some folks to bear" – created a lot of resentment among many writers, including writers in English. In his book, Amit Chaudhuri questions – "Can it be true that Indian writing, that endlessly rich, complex and problematic entity, is to be represented by a handful of writers who write in English, who live in England or America and whom one might have met at a party?"

Chaudhuri feels that after Rushdie, IWE started employing magical realism, bagginess, non-linear narrative and hybrid language to sustain themes seen as microcosms of India and supposedly reflecting Indian conditions. He contrasts this with the works of earlier writers such as Narayan where the use of English is pure, but the deciphering of meaning needs cultural familiarity. He also feels that Indianness is a theme constructed only in IWE and does not articulate itself in the vernacular literatures. He further adds "the post-colonial novel, becomes a trope for an ideal hybridity by which the West celebrates not so much Indianness, whatever that infinitely complex thing is, but its own historical quest, its reinterpretation of itself".

Some of these arguments form an integral part of what is called postcolonial theory. The very categorisation of IWE – as IWE or under post-colonial literature – is seen by some as limiting. Amitav Ghosh made his views on this very clear by refusing to accept the Eurasian Commonwealth Writers Prize for his book The Glass Palace in 2001 and withdrawing it from the subsequent stage.

The renowned writer V. S. Naipaul, a third generation Indian from Trinidad and Tobago and a Nobel prize laureate, is a person who belongs to the world and usually not classified under IWE. Naipaul evokes ideas of homeland, rootlessness and his own personal feelings towards India in many of his books.

Jhumpa Lahiri, a Pulitzer prize winner from the U.S., is a writer uncomfortable under the label of IWE.

Poetry
Early notable poets in English include Derozio, Michael Madhusudan Dutt, Toru Dutt, Romesh Chunder Dutt, Sri Aurobindo, Sarojini Naidu, and her brother Harindranath Chattopadhyay. Notable 20th Century authors of English poetry in India include Dilip Chitre, Kamala Das, Eunice De Souza, Nissim Ezekiel, Kersy Katrak, Shiv K. Kumar, Arun Kolatkar, P. Lal, Jayanta Mahapatra, Dom Moraes, Gieve Patel, A. K. Ramanujan, Madan Gopal Gandhi, and P C K Prem among several others.

The younger generation of poets writing in English include Abhay K, Arundhathi Subramaniam, Anju Makhija, Arnab Jan Deka, Bibhu Padhi, Ranjit Hoskote, Sudeep Sen, Smita Agarwal, Makarand Paranjape, Jeet Thayil, Jaydeep Sarangi, Mani Rao, Jerry Pinto, K. V. Dominic, Meena Kandasamy, Nalini Priyadarshni, Gopi Kottoor, Tapan Kumar Pradhan, Rukmini Bhaya Nair, Robin Ngangom, Vihang A. Naik, Anuradha Bhattacharyya, K Srilata and Nandini Sahu.

Modern expatriate Indian poets writing in English include Agha Shahid Ali, Sujata Bhatt, Richard Crasta, Yuyutsu Sharma, Tabish Khair and Vikram Seth.

Alternative writing

India's experimental and avant garde counterculture is symbolized in the Prakalpana Movement. During the last four decades this bilingual literary movement has included Richard Kostelanetz, John M. Bennett, Don Webb, Sheila Murphy and many others worldwide and their Indian counterparts. Vattacharja Chandan is a central figure who contrived the movement.  Prakalpana fiction is a fusion of prose, poetry, play, essay, and pictures. An example of a Prakalpana work is Chandan's bilingual Cosmosphere 1 (2011).

See also
Indian Writing in English
Indian literature
Indian poetry in English
List of English poets from India
Literature from North East India

Notes

References

Auddy, Ranjan Kumar. "In Search of Indian English: History,Politics and Indigenisation. London & New York: Routledge, 2020  & 978-0-367-35271 & 978-0-429-33160-2
Haq, Kaiser (ed.). Contemporary Indian Poetry.Columbus: Ohio State University Press,1990.
Haq, Rubana (ed.). The Golden Treasury of Writers Workshop Poetry. Kolkata: Writers Workshop, 2008.
Hoskote, Ranjit (ed.). Reasons for Belonging: Fourteen Contemporary Indian Poets. Viking/Penguin Books India, New Delhi, 2002.
Singh, Bijender. "Indian Writing in English: Critical Insights." New Delhi, Authorspress, 2014.
Indian Writing in English  | Men and Dreams in the Dhauladhar by Novels by Indian Authors - Kochery C Shibu 
Joseph, Margaret Paul. "Jasmine on a String: a Survey of Women Writing English Fiction in India." Oxford University Press, 2014.
King, Bruce Alvin. Modern Indian Poetry in English: Revised Edition. New Delhi: Oxford University Press, 1987, rev. 2001. ("the standard work on the subject and unlikely to be surpassed" — Mehrotra, 2003).
King, Bruce Alvin. Three Indian Poets: Nissim Ezekiel, A K Ramanujan, Dom Moraes. Madras: Oxford University Press, 1991.
Mehrotra, Arvind Krishna (ed.). The Oxford India Anthology of Twelve Modern Indian Poets. Calcutta: Oxford University Press, 1992.
Mehrotra, Arvind Krishna (ed.). A History of Indian Literature in English. New York: Columbia University Press, 2003. Distributed in India by Doaba Books Shanti Mohan House 16, Ansari Road, New Delhi.
Parthasarathy, R. (ed.). Ten Twentieth-Century Indian Poets (New Poetry in India). New Delhi: Oxford University Press, 1976.
Prem, PCK. English Poetry in India: A Comprehensive Survey of Trends and Thought Patterns New Delhi: Authorspress, 2011.
Reddy, T. Vasudeva. A Critical Survey of Indo-English Poetry New Delhi: Authorspress, 2016.
Roy, Pinaki. "Encountering the West: A Very Brief Overview of the Indian Diasporic Novelists". Journal of Higher Education and Research Society (ISSN 2321-9432) 1(1), October 2013: http://herso.org/vol-1-issue-1-oct-2013/
Roy, Pinaki. “Dramatic Chronicle: A Very Brief Review of the Growth of Indian English Plays”. Indian Drama in English: Some Perspectives. Ed. Kaushik, A.S. New Delhi: Atlantic Publishers and Distributors Pvt. Ltd., 2013. pp. 272–87. 
Sadana, Rashmi. "Writing in English," in The Cambridge Companion to Modern Indian Culture. Cambridge: Cambridge University Press, 2012.
Sadana, Rashmi. English Heart, Hindi Heartland: the Political Life of Literature in India. Berkeley: University of California Press, 2012.
Shivdasani, Menka (ed.). Anthology of Contemporary Indian Poetry : USA, BigBridge.Org, Michael Rothenberg, 2004. 
Souza, Eunice de. "Nine Indian Women Poets", Delhi, Oxford University Press, 1997.
Souza, Eunice de. Talking Poems: Conversations With Poets. New Delhi: Oxford University Press, 1999.
Souza, Eunice de. Early Indian Poetry in English: An Anthology : 1829-1947. New Delhi: Oxford University Press, 2005.
Srikanth, Rajini. The World Next Door: South Asian American Literature and the Idea of America. Asian American History and Culture. Philadelphia: Temple UP, 2004.
Mahapatra, Jayanta & Sharma, Yuyutsu (ed.). Ten: The New Indian Poets. New Delhi: Nirala Publications, 1993. http://niralapublications.com/new-release-ten-the-new-indian-poets/
Jha, Vivekananad. (ed) The Dance of the Peacock.  Canada: Hidden Brook Press, 2014.

 

 
Indian literature by language